Flowers v. Mississippi, No. 17–9572, 588 U.S. ___ (2019), was a United States Supreme Court case regarding the use of peremptory challenges to remove black jurors during a series of Mississippi criminal trials for Curtis Flowers, a black man convicted on murder charges. The Supreme Court held in Batson v. Kentucky that the use of peremptory challenges solely on the basis of race is unconstitutional. This case examined whether the Mississippi Supreme Court erred in how it applied Batson to this case. The Supreme Court ruled that Flowers' case fell under Batson and that the state inappropriately removed most of the potential black jurors during the trials.

Case background
Curtis Flowers was accused in 1996 of four murders in a furniture store in Winona, Mississippi. Since his arrest, Flowers has seen six separate jury trials. The first three trials ended with overturned convictions from the Mississippi Supreme Court on review, citing prosecutorial misconduct in all three trials, while the fourth and fifth ended in a mistrial. At issue throughout these trials was the prosecution's use of peremptory challenges to eliminate prospective African-Americans from the jury, leaving a solely white jury despite the population distribution near Winona being near 50% white, 50% African-American. Only by the fourth trial did two African-Americans sit on the jury, resulting in a hung jury.

The sixth trial, held in 2010, found Flowers guilty of all four crimes, and he was sentenced to death. The jury here included one African-American juror—the first one questioned by the prosecutor who subsequently used his remaining peremptory challenges to dismiss five additional African-American jurors. Flowers appealed to the Mississippi Supreme Court again arguing on the peremptory challenges. The Mississippi Supreme Court upheld the verdict. Flowers petitioned to the United States Supreme Court, who summarily remanded the case to the Mississippi Supreme Court and told the court to review the peremptory challenge under the Batson challenge established in the case Batson v. Kentucky. On review, the Mississippi Supreme Court still found against Flowers, ruling that the prosecutor was not racially biased in the use of peremptory challenges during Flowers' trial. One aspect that was argued in this retrial was the past behavior in the previous trials that Flowers' defense felt showed a clear racial discrimination pattern by the prosecution to remove African-American jurors from the jury, but which the Mississippi Supreme Court dismissed in their Batson analysis.

Flowers re-petitioned to the US Supreme Court, which granted certiorari to the case in November 2018. The case was limited to the question of whether the Mississippi's oversight of the prosecution's past use of peremptory challenges in Flowers' prior trials was proper within the scope of the Batson challenge. Oral arguments were heard on March 20, 2019.

Opinions

Majority opinion by Brett Kavanaugh
On June 21, 2019, in a 7–2 decision authored by Associate Justice Brett Kavanaugh, the Court held that the Flowers case clearly fell under Batson and the Mississippi Supreme Court erred in upholding the trial court's conviction.  In its history of 6 trials prosecuting Flowers for murder, the previous 5 of which ended in mistrials or vacated convictions, the state struck 41 of the 42 prospective black jurors. Some of the selected white jurors had similar answers to struck black jurors and when the prosecutor was asked for explanations other than race for excluding the jurors, the prosecutor also gave inaccurate or provably false explanations for excluding black jurors.

Concurrence by Samuel Alito
Samuel Alito wrote a concurrence. Alito stated that he believes this was “a highly unusual case” that was likely “one of a kind.” Alito also stated that this was “not an ordinary case, and the jury selection process cannot be analyzed as if it were.”

Dissent by Clarence Thomas
Clarence Thomas wrote the dissenting opinion, which was joined in part by Neil Gorsuch, stating that they would have upheld Flowers’ conviction. Thomas suggested that the prosecution's use of their peremptory challenge was appropriate as most of those dismissed knew of Flowers and his family and thus would be biased on a jury. Thomas’ opinion suggests Batson v. Kentucky (1986), which forbids prosecutors from using race as a factor in making peremptory challenges in jury selection, was wrongly decided and should be overruled. Gorsuch, however, did not join the section of Thomas’ opinion suggesting Batson should be overruled.

Subsequent events
State prosecutors officially dropped the charges against Flowers on September 4, 2020, with the state's attorney general's office stating that it would be nearly impossible to convict Flowers on any charges at this point due to the conflicts with the past court records being considered unusable leaving them with no new living witnesses.

See also 
 In the Dark (podcast), an American Public Media podcast whose 2nd season examined Flowers' case

References

External links
 

Batson challenge case law
United States Supreme Court cases
United States Supreme Court cases of the Roberts Court
2019 in United States case law
Winona, Mississippi
Brett Kavanaugh